Maiden Castle is a settlement in Grinton, North Yorkshire which probably dates from the Iron Age. It is listed as a Scheduled Ancient Monument. The name Maiden Castle is not unique to the site and occurs in several other places in Britain and probably means a "fortification that looks impregnable" or one that has never been taken in battle.

An avenue leading to the entrance of the settlement is a unique feature. Maiden Castle has been described as a banjo enclosure due to its shape, however this description has been disputed. If it is a banjo enclosure, it would be one of just two in northern England, the other being Fremington Dykes.

The only dating evidence recovered from Maiden Castle is a "post-and-panel building" which is typologically similar to a structure discovered in Healaugh that has been dated to the late Iron Age or Romano-British periods.

References
Notes

Bibliography

Hill forts in North Yorkshire
Scheduled monuments in North Yorkshire
Swaledale